Ralph Baze (born July 1, 1955) is a convicted murderer who sued the Kentucky State Department of Corrections along with fellow inmate Thomas Clyde Bowling Jr. to challenge their impending execution. He and Bowling sued on the grounds that execution by lethal injection using the "cocktail" prescribed by Kentucky law constitutes cruel and unusual punishment in violation of the 8th Amendment. Baze's court case was Baze v. Rees.

Baze had been scheduled for execution on 25 September 2007 but, on 12 September, was issued a stay of execution by the Kentucky Supreme Court. The United States Supreme Court agreed to hear his appeal. On April 16, 2008 the Court affirmed the Kentucky Supreme Court's decision that the injection protocol does not violate the Eighth Amendment.

Baze does not dispute that he shot and killed Powell County, Kentucky Sheriff Steve Bennett and Deputy Arthur Briscoe in 1992 as they attempted to serve an arrest warrant on him, but claims that the shootings were self-defense.

Baze is incarcerated on death row in Kentucky State Penitentiary in Eddyville, Kentucky.

See also
 List of death row inmates in the United States

References

 Ky. Inmate Challenges Execution Method, Brett Barrouquere, Associated Press, 25 September 2007
Ralph Baze granted stay of execution, Brett Barrouquere Courier-Journal, 12 September 2007

American people convicted of murder
American prisoners sentenced to death
Prisoners sentenced to death by Kentucky
People convicted of murder by Kentucky
1955 births
1992 murders in the United States
Living people
American people convicted of murdering police officers